K296 or K-296 may refer to:

K-296 (Kansas highway), a former state highway in Kansas
K296GB, a radio station 
K2-296b, a planet
K.296 Violin Sonata No. 17 (Mozart) in C (1778)